33 Corps, 33rd Corps, Thirty Third Corps, or XXXIII Corps may refer to:

 XXXIII Corps (British India) 
 XXXIII Corps (India)
 XXXIII Corps (United States)
 33rd Army Corps (Russian Empire)
 XXXIII Army Corps (Wehrmacht)

See also
List of military corps by number
 33rd Battalion (disambiguation)
 33rd Brigade (disambiguation)
 33rd Division (disambiguation)
 33rd Regiment (disambiguation)
 33 Squadron (disambiguation)